Yusif Rahman (born 26 January 1993) is a Ghanaian footballer who plays as a forward.

References

External links
 
 

1993 births
Living people
Association football forwards
Ghanaian footballers
Cypriot First Division players
Cypriot Second Division players
Alki Larnaca FC players
PAEEK players
Ethnikos Latsion FC players
Ormideia F.C. players
Ghanaian expatriate footballers
Expatriate footballers in Cyprus
Ghanaian expatriate sportspeople in Cyprus